Sorbus multicrenata is a species of plant in the family Rosaceae. It is endemic to Germany, where it is known from only a single location in Thuringia.

References

multicrenata
Endangered plants
Endemic flora of Germany
Taxonomy articles created by Polbot